Arceuthobium campylopodum is a species of dwarf mistletoe known as western dwarf mistletoe. It is native to the low to moderate elevation coniferous forests of western North America. It is a common parasite of several species of pine tree, including Jeffrey Pine, Ponderosa Pine, and Coulter Pine. The dwarf mistletoe is a greenish-yellow structure above the bark of the tree, while most of the plant is beneath the bark. Seeds mature during the fall and disperse to nearby trees.

Uses
Some Plateau Indian tribes used western dwarf mistletoe as a wash to prevent dandruff.

References

External links
Jepson Manual Treatment
Photo gallery

campylopodum